Catillon-sur-Sambre (literally Catillon on Sambre) is a commune of the Nord department in northern France.

Heraldry

See also
Communes of the Nord department

References

Catillonsursambre